The 1984 Ladies European Tour  was the fifth season of golf tournaments administered by the Professional Golfers' Association (PGA) on behalf of the Women's Professional Golfers' Association (WPGA), which later became the Ladies European Tour (LET).

In the second season of PGA administration, the tour saw the addition of several new tournaments with the format of most being changed to 72-holes stroke play, having been mostly 54 and 36-hole events previously. In total, there were 21 tournaments on the schedule, including the return of the Women's British Open, organised by the Ladies' Golf Union and one of two tournaments co-sanctioned by the LPGA Tour, along with the Ladies Irish Open.

The Order of Merit was won by Dale Reid, who dominated the season with two tournament victories and five runner-up finishes. In second place was Kitrina Douglas, who won twice during her debut season.

Tournaments
The table below shows the 1984 schedule. The numbers in brackets after the winners' names show the number of career wins they had on the Ladies European Tour up to and including that event. This is only shown for members of the tour. 

Major championships in bold.

Order of Merit
The Order of Merit was sponsored by Ring and Brymer and based on prize money won throughout the season.

See also
1984 LPGA Tour

References

External links
Official site of the Ladies European Tour

Ladies European Tour
Ladies European Tour
Ladies European Tour